Morskogen is a stretch of woodland on the Mjøsa, Norway's biggest lake. It is located between Eidsvoll, Viken (the place where the Norwegian constitution was written in 1814) and Stange, Innlandet. 

Morskogen was a battlefield in 1940 between the invading German Wehrmacht and the Norwegian Army, which ended in victory for the Germans. 

In current times, it is  best known for being right on the E6 and having one of Norway’s most dangerous roads, with an unusually high frequency of deaths caused by traffic accidents. Morskogen railway station is a former railway station on the Dovre Line. The station was established in 1880 and operated until  1983.

References 

Forests and woodlands of Norway
Geography of Innlandet
Geography of Viken (county)
Military history of Norway during World War II